Merchants Manor Hotel is a hotel set on a hill above the town of Falmouth in Cornwall. Originally a mansion built in 1913 for the Carne family of merchants and brewers who developed the screw–cap bottle, in 1958, it became known as the Green Lawns Hotel. It became the Merchants Manor Hotel in 2012.

References

Hotels in Cornwall
2012 establishments in England
Hotels established in 2012